Andrew or Andy Barker may refer to:

People
 Andrew Barker (merchant) (died 1577), English merchant
 Andrew Barker (classicist) (1943–2021), British academic specialising in ancient Greek music
 Andrew Barker (cricketer) (born 1945), English former cricketer
 Andy Barker (philanthropist) (1924–2011), American philanthropist
 Andy Barker (1968–2021), British musician (808 State)

Other uses
 Andy Barker, P.I., an American detective sitcom and the title character